195 most commonly refers to:
 195 (number), a number
 195 AD, a year
 195 BC, a year

195 may also refer to:

Military

Canada
 195th (City of Regina) Battalion, CEF, a Canadian Expeditionary Force unit

United Kingdom
 195th (2/1st Scottish Rifles) Brigade, an infantry brigade of the British Army
 No. 195 Squadron RAF, an aircraft squadron of the Royal Air Force

United States
 195th Fighter Squadron, an Arizona Air National Guard unit
 195th Ohio Infantry Regiment, an infantry regiment of the Union Army
 VFA-195, a fighter squadron of the United States Navy

Transportation

Aircraft
 Blériot 195, a 1929 French monoplane mail-carrier
 Cessna 195, a 1947–1954 American general aviation airplane

Automobiles
 Ferrari 195 S, a 1950 Italian sports racing car
 Ferrari 195 Inter, a 1950–1951 Italian grand tourer
 Jordan 195, a 1995 British Formula One car

Roads and routes
 List of highways numbered 195
 Interstate 195 (disambiguation)

Watercraft
 German submarine U-195, a Type IXD1 transport U-boat of Nazi Germany

Other uses
 195 Eurykleia, a main belt asteroid
 195 Broadway, an early skyscraper in the Financial District of Manhattan, New York City, New York, United States